Radhames Corey Liz Garcia (born October 6, 1983) is a Dominican professional baseball pitcher for the Toros de Tijuana of the Mexican League. He previously played for the Baltimore Orioles and Pittsburgh Pirates of Major League Baseball (MLB), the LG Twins of the KBO League, the Tohoku Rakuten Golden Eagles of Nippon Professional Baseball (NPB), and the Lamigo Monkeys of the Chinese Professional Baseball League (CPBL).

Biography
He started pitching in the United States during the  season.

Professional career

Baltimore Orioles
Liz began his professional career in 2005, going 7–7 with a 2.86 ERA in 21 starts with the Single-A Aberdeen IronBirds and the Single-A Delmarva Shorebirds. In , Liz started the year with the Frederick Keys, the highest of the Orioles' three Single-A teams. Liz began the season by striking out 33 batters in his first 15 innings pitched. Later in the year, he represented the Orioles on the World squad at the All-Star Futures Game. He also received a promotion to the Double-A Bowie Baysox; between the two teams, he struck out 149 batters in 133 innings before playing in the Dominican Winter League. However, he had difficulty with his control in the 2006 season, walking 75 batters. Baseball America named Liz the Orioles' fifth-best prospect going into the  season, following Billy Rowell, Brandon Erbe, Nolan Reimold, and Pedro Beato.

Liz returned to Bowie for the 2007 season and was selected for the Eastern League's All-Star Game. He no-hit the Harrisburg Senators on June 1. His no-hitter was the first nine-inning no-hitter ever pitched at Prince George's Stadium, which has been open since . On August 14, Liz took a no-hitter into the eighth inning against the Connecticut Defenders; he then allowed a single and a two-run home run, but struck out 14 batters in eight innings.

For the 2007 season, Liz had an 11–4 record for the Baysox with a 3.22 ERA and 161 strikeouts in 137 innings pitched. In his 10 starts at the Baysox' Prince George's Stadium, he was 9–0 with a 2.02 ERA in 62 innings pitched.

The Orioles recalled Liz from Bowie on August 24, to make a start against the Minnesota Twins at Oriole Park at Camden Yards the following day. He allowed five runs, including a three-run home run to Torii Hunter, in six innings. He consistently threw 97–98 miles per hour, with one pitch clocked at 100. In 2008, he mostly played for the Norfolk Tides, the Orioles' Triple-A affiliate in Norfolk, Virginia. In 15 starts with the Tides, Liz was 3–7 with a 3.62 ERA.

San Diego Padres
On November 25, 2009, Liz was claimed off waivers by the San Diego Padres. He played the 2010 season with the Portland Beavers, Triple-A affiliate of the Padres, and posted an 8–8 record with a 4.83 ERA and 109 strikeouts in 25 games (22 starts).

On January 5, 2011, Liz was released by the Padres.

LG Twins
On January 7, 2011, he signed with the LG Twins of the KBO League. Liz enjoyed a tenure of success in the KBO, leading the league in strikeouts in 2013 with 188. He would post a 26–38 record with a 3.51 ERA in three seasons with the Twins, totalling 518 innings pitched.

Toronto Blue Jays
Liz signed a minor league contract with the Toronto Blue Jays on March 8, 2014, and was assigned to the Triple-A Buffalo Bisons. After starting the season on the disabled list, he was assigned to the New Hampshire Fisher Cats on May 25 for a start against the Portland Sea Dogs.

Pittsburgh Pirates
On December 13, 2014, Liz signed a one-year Major League contract with the Pittsburgh Pirates for $1 million. Initially it was reported to be a two-year contract for $3 million. However, the deal was adjusted due to the Pirates being "uncomfortable" with Liz's physical results. On May 25, Liz was designated for assignment. He was re-added to the major league roster on September 1 and designated for assignment again on September 15.

Tohoku Rakuten Golden Eagles
On November 26, 2015, Liz signed a one-year deal with the Tohoku Rakuten Golden Eagles of Nippon Professional Baseball for the 2016 season.

Milwaukee Brewers
On December 22, 2017, Liz signed a minor league contract with the Milwaukee Brewers. He was released on June 1, 2018.

Lamigo Monkeys
On February 1, 2019, Liz signed with the Lamigo Monkeys of the Chinese Professional Baseball League. On January 5, 2020, he re-signed with the team (now named the Rakuten Monkeys) for the 2020 season. However, on February 9, Liz opted out of his contract for unspecified reasons, though he later clarified that it was due to a herniated disc in his back that he wanted to address.

Leones de Yucatán
On February 23, 2021, Liz signed with the Leones de Yucatán of the Mexican League.

Toros de Tijuana
On December 2, 2022, Liz was traded to the Toros de Tijuana of the Mexican League in exchange for P Tyler Alexander.

Scouting report
Liz is known for his remarkably long arms; when he stands with his arms at his sides, his fingers reach below his knees. Liz uses a straight overhand pitching motion and throws his fastball consistently in the mid- to upper-90s and has been clocked at 99 mph. His other pitches include an overhand curveball, a sinker, a slider, and two variations of a changeup. Early in his professional career, Liz received attention because of a clicking sound which is sometimes loud enough to be heard in the stands and occurs whenever he throws a pitch. Some have thought it to be his thumb clicking against his index finger. Orioles head athletic trainer Richie Bancells discovered that Liz's scapula caused the clicking; although rare, this condition does not hurt his pitching career. To treat this condition, Liz has been doing an exercise program to strengthen the muscles around his collarbone.

Honours

Club 

Lamigo Monkeys
Taiwan Series Champions: 2019

Individual 

CPBL wins champions: 2019
CPBL strikeout champions: 2019

Personal life
Liz is of Haitian descent.

References

External links 

Career statistics and player information from the KBO League

1983 births
Living people
Aberdeen IronBirds players
Baltimore Orioles players
Bowie Baysox players
Buffalo Bisons (minor league) players
Delmarva Shorebirds players
Dominican Republic expatriate baseball players in Japan
Dominican Republic expatriate baseball players in Mexico
Dominican Republic expatriate baseball players in South Korea
Dominican Republic expatriate baseball players in Taiwan
Dominican Republic expatriate baseball players in the United States
Dominican Republic people of Haitian descent
Estrellas Orientales players
Frederick Keys players
Indianapolis Indians players
KBO League pitchers
Lamigo Monkeys players
Leones de Yucatán players
LG Twins players
Major League Baseball pitchers
Major League Baseball players from the Dominican Republic
New Hampshire Fisher Cats players
Nippon Professional Baseball pitchers
Norfolk Tides players
People from El Seibo Province
Pittsburgh Pirates players
Portland Beavers players
Tohoku Rakuten Golden Eagles players